The following is a list of television series produced in Slovakia:

0-9

A

B

D

K

M

N

O

P

R

S 
 Silvánovci
 Spadla z oblakov (Czechoslovakia 1978, Slovak language)
 Susedia
 Sestričky

V 
 V mene zákona
 Veľké srdce

Z

See also
 OTO award for TV series

External links
 Slovakia TV at the Internet Movie Database

 
Slovakia
Television series